"When You Sleep" is a song by rock band My Bloody Valentine on the album Loveless. It was the first single released from the album.

Background and composition 

In an interview with Select, Shields explained the stop-start nature of his recording, using "When You Sleep" as an example:

The layered vocals on "When You Sleep" were born out of frustration with trying to get the right take. Shields commented that "The vocals sound like that because it became boring and too destructive trying to get the right vocal. So I decided to put all the vocals in. (It had been sung 12 or 13 times)." He explained:

Reception
Gio Santiago of Pitchfork included "When You Sleep" in his list of best songs of the 1990s, describing the song as "a firework of emotion gone awry, a love song that leaves you so helplessly and hazily entranced. [It's] filled with indelible blown-out noise, shattered guitar feedback, and muddled confessions narrowly escaping the surface." Alexis Petridis of The Guardian ranked it as the 6th best My Bloody Valentine song, stating that "When You Sleep" stands out in Loveless due to its "blissful melody and smeared multitracked vocals [that] evoke a stoned, uncertain kind of euphoria."

Track listing

References

External links
 "When You Sleep" at AllMusic.com
 "When You Sleep" at Discogs.com

1991 singles
1991 songs
My Bloody Valentine (band) songs
Songs written by Kevin Shields